Nazar Penkovets (born 2 September 1987 in Kiev, Ukrainian SSR) is a professional Ukrainian football goalkeeper who plays for Austrian club FC Kitzbühel.

Penkovets is a product of the FC Obolon-Zmina Youth Sportive School System. He played for the Ukrainian and Polish amateur or lower level clubs.

References

External links 

1987 births
Living people
Ukrainian footballers
Ukrainian expatriate footballers
Association football goalkeepers
FC Hoverla Uzhhorod players
FC Obolon-2 Kyiv players
FC Inter Boyarka players
Górnik Polkowice players
Elana Toruń players
Wisła Puławy players
Expatriate footballers in Poland
Expatriate footballers in Austria
Ukrainian expatriate sportspeople in Poland
Ukrainian expatriate sportspeople in Austria
Footballers from Kyiv